Yussukovo (Yusıq) is a rural locality (a selo) in Asavdybashsky Selsoviet, Yanaulsky District, Bashkortostan, Russia. The population was 183 as of 2010. There are 3 streets.

Geography 
Yussukovo is located 26 km southeast of Yanaul (the district's administrative centre) by road. Asavdybash is the nearest rural locality.

References 

Rural localities in Yanaulsky District